The Dollar Loan Center is a multi-purpose indoor arena in Henderson, Nevada. Built on the site of the former Henderson Pavilion, it is the home of the Henderson Silver Knights of the American Hockey League, the Vegas Knight Hawks of the Indoor Football League and the NBA G League Ignite of the NBA G League. The City of Henderson is the building owner with the National Hockey League's Vegas Golden Knights as its operator. The Dollar Loan Center seats 5,567 for hockey and football. Initially called the Henderson Event Center, on March 30, 2021, the Golden Knights and Silver Knights announced a naming rights partnership with Dollar Loan Center, a Las Vegas-based short-term loan company, for the arena to be called The Dollar Loan Center. The name of the arena is disambiguated with the article "The" to differentiate it from the company.

The arena's primary function is to serve as the home of the Henderson Silver Knights of the American Hockey League and the arena was constructed primarily for that purpose. The Vegas Golden Knights purchased the AHL franchise known as the San Antonio Rampage on February 6, 2020, from Spurs Sports & Entertainment. The sale of the team and its relocation to the Las Vegas suburb of Henderson was approved by the AHL Board of Governors on February 28, 2020. The first Silver Knights game played at The Dollar Loan Center was on April 2, 2022.

In May 2021, the Indoor Football League (IFL) announced that Bill Foley, owner of the National Hockey League's Vegas Golden Knights, had purchased an IFL franchise to compete at The Dollar Loan Center. On August 23, 2021, Foley announced that the team would be known as the Vegas Knight Hawks and that Mike Davis would be the franchise's general manager and head coach.  On May 10, 2022, it was announced that the IFL National Championship game would be played at The Dollar Loan Center for the 2022–2024 seasons.

The Big West Conference announced on June 24, 2021, that the men's and women's basketball championships would be held at The Dollar Loan Center starting in 2022. 
In fact, the Big West Conference tournament was the first event held at the arena.

See also 
List of indoor arenas in the United States

References

External links 
Official Site

Henderson Silver Knights
NBA G League Ignite
Buildings and structures in Henderson, Nevada
Sports in Henderson, Nevada
NBA G League venues
Boxing venues in Las Vegas
Music venues in the Las Vegas Valley
Sports venues in Las Vegas
Indoor arenas in Las Vegas
Basketball venues in Nevada
Indoor ice hockey venues in the United States